The 2004 Anaheim Angels season was the franchise's 44th since its inception. The regular season ended with a record of 92–70, resulting in the Angels winning their fourth American League West division title, their first since 1986. Their playoff run was short, as they were quickly swept by the Boston Red Sox in the American League Division Series.

The season was notable for being the last season the Angels played under the "Anaheim Angels" moniker; owner Arte Moreno changed the team name to the controversial "Los Angeles Angels of Anaheim" moniker the following season. It was also notable as the season in which newly signed outfielder Vladimir Guerrero won the AL Most Valuable Player award, the first time an Angels player had been so honored since Don Baylor in 1979.

Offseason
October 27, 2003: Adam Riggs was signed as a free agent with the Anaheim Angels.
November 24, 2003: Kelvim Escobar was signed as a free agent with the Anaheim Angels.
January 14, 2004: Vladimir Guerrero was signed as a free agent with the Anaheim Angels.

Regular season

Season standings

Record vs. opponents

Notable transactions
May 30, 2004: Raúl Mondesí signed as a free agent with the Anaheim Angels.
August 4, 2004: Raúl Mondesí was released by the Anaheim Angels.

Draft picks
June 7, 2004: Pat White was drafted in the 4th round, 113th overall in the 2004 Major League Baseball Draft. White opted to play quarterback at the University of West Virginia.
June 7, 2004: Freddy Sandoval was drafted by the Anaheim Angels in the 8th round of the 2004 amateur draft. Player signed June 29, 2004.

Roster

Player stats

Batting

Starters by position
Note: Pos = Position; G = Games played; AB = At bats; R = Runs; H = Hits; HR = Home runs; RBI = Runs batted in; Avg. = Batting average; SB = Stolen bases

Other batters
Note: G = Games; AB = At bats; H = Hits; Avg. = Batting average; HR = Home runs; RBI = Runs batted in

Pitching

Starting pitchers
Note: G = Games pitched; IP = Innings pitched; W = Wins; L = Losses; ERA = Earned run average; SO = Strikeouts

Other pitchers 
Note: G = Games pitched; IP = Innings pitched; W = Wins; L = Losses; ERA = Earned run average; SO = Strikeouts

Relief pitchers 
Note: G = Games pitched; W = Wins; L = Losses: SV = Saves; ERA = Earned run average; SO = Strikeouts

ALDS
Boston wins the series, 3-0

Farm system

References

2004 Anaheim Angels team page at Baseball Reference
2004 Anaheim Angels team page at www.baseball-almanac.com

Los Angeles Angels seasons
American League West champion seasons
Los
Los